Yedigöz, historically Vışlar, is a village in the Musabeyli District, Kilis Province, Turkey. The village is inhabited by Kurds and had a population of 1011 in 2022.

References

Villages in Musabeyli District
Kurdish settlements in Kilis Province